The Diamond Peddlers (also known as Diamond Pedlar) is a 1976 Italian comedy film directed by Giuliano Carnimeo and starring Michael Coby and Paul L. Smith. It is the sequel of Convoy Buddies.

Plot

Cast 
Michael Coby as  Butch (Matteo)
Paul L. Smith as  Toby (Simone)
Dominic Barto as Morgan
Jacques Herlin as Inspector Nelson
Claudio Gora as Mr. Robinson 
Giuseppe Maffioli as Priest
Riccardo Petrazzi as Massimo 
Franco Pesce as Father Mansueto

See also 
 List of Italian films of 1976

References

External links

1970s buddy comedy films
Films directed by Giuliano Carnimeo
Films scored by Guido & Maurizio De Angelis
Italian sequel films
Italian buddy comedy films
1976 comedy films
1976 films
1970s Italian-language films
1970s Italian films